Albert Jenkins may refer to:

Albert G. Jenkins (1830–1864), Brigadier General (Confederacy), American Civil War
Albert Jenkins (footballer) (1861–1940), English footballer who formed Doncaster Rovers in 1879
Albert Jenkins (rugby union) (1895–1953), Welsh international rugby union player
Bert Jenkins (1885–1943), Welsh rugby league footballer who played in the 1900s, 1910s and 1920s for Great Britain, Wales, and Wigan

See also
Al Jenkins (disambiguation)